Anguilla, which is a British overseas territory in the Caribbean, has competed at five Commonwealth Games to date, beginning in 1998.

Medal tally

Anguilla is unranked on the all-time medal tally of the Commonwealth Games, having never won a medal.

History
Anguilla first participated in the 1998 Games, held at Kuala Lumpur, Malaysia.

References

 
Nations at the Commonwealth Games